The 2022 Worthing Borough Council election took place on 5 May 2022 to elect members of Worthing Borough Council, on the same day as other UK local elections.

The Labour Party won control of the council for the first time, ending 18 years of Conservative administration.

Ward results

Broadwater

Castle

Central

Durrington

Gaisford

Goring

Heene

Marine

Northbrook

Offington

Salvington

Selden

Tarring

References 

Worthing
Worthing Borough Council elections
2020s in West Sussex